The Hibbettage was a historic mansion in Nashville, Tennessee, U.S.. It was built in 1938 for B. K. Hibbett. It was designed in the Colonial Revival architectural style by George D. Waller, who was inspired by The Hermitage. Construction was discontinued due to World War II, and it was resumed in 1948. It was listed on the National Register of Historic Places on October 30, 1998. The home was purchased in January 2020 for $11.4 million by David Bronson Ingram an American heir, businessman and philanthropist. He is the chairman and president of Ingram Entertainment, the largest distributor of DVDs and video games in the US. The Tennessean did a story on 11/25/2020 about how the historic preservation society took meaningful artifacts from the home before its demolition in 2020. The site was removed from the National Register in April, 2022

References

Houses on the National Register of Historic Places in Tennessee
Colonial Revival architecture in Tennessee
Houses completed in 1948
Houses in Nashville, Tennessee